Bettina Heltberg (born September 28, 1942) is a Danish writer and actor.

The daughter of Niels Johannes Heltberg and Grethe Heltberg, she was born in Frederiksberg and grew up there. She attended acting school and later completed a degree in political science from Aarhus University in 1972. Heltberg worked as a secretary for the Danish Ministry of Culture from 1972 to 1974.

She appeared in the 1962 film Det støver stadig.

Heltberg wrote on culture and was an editorial writer for the newspaper Politiken. From 1975 to 1977, she was editor of the Social Democrat journal Ny Politik.

She married Svend Auken in 1966; the couple had four children. They divorced in 1993. Heltberg's autobiographical book Hvor der handles. Erindringsbilleder , published in 1996, includes a behind the scenes view of the leadership convention where Auken was defeated as party leader by Poul Nyrup Rasmussen.

Selected works 
 Apéritif, novel (1964)
 Kvindesag (1976)
 Resten er tavshed, about William Shakespeare (1999)
 Deadline, novel (2002)
 George, about George Clooney (2006)

References

External links 
 

1942 births
Living people
Danish women novelists
Danish women journalists
Danish film actresses
People from Frederiksberg
Politiken people